Dimitrie Popescu (born 10 September 1961 in Straja, Suceava) is a retired Romanian rower. He competed in various events at the 1984, 1988, 1992 and 1996 Olympics and won one gold, two silver and one bronze medal. He won the same set of medals at the world championships in 1985–1996. After retiring from competition he worked as a coach for CSA Steaua.

References

External links 

 
 
 

1961 births
Living people
Romanian male rowers
Rowers at the 1984 Summer Olympics
Rowers at the 1988 Summer Olympics
Rowers at the 1992 Summer Olympics
Rowers at the 1996 Summer Olympics
Olympic rowers of Romania
Olympic gold medalists for Romania
Olympic silver medalists for Romania
Olympic bronze medalists for Romania
Olympic medalists in rowing
Medalists at the 1992 Summer Olympics
Medalists at the 1988 Summer Olympics
Medalists at the 1984 Summer Olympics
World Rowing Championships medalists for Romania